Coleophora obviella is a moth of the family Coleophoridae. It is found from the Czech Republic to Italy and Albania.

The larvae feed on Leontopodium alpinum and Primula auricula. Larvae can be found from June to May.

References

obviella
Moths described in 1914
Moths of Europe